Bezos Expeditions is an American investment firm based in Mercer Island, Washington. It serves as a family office for Amazon.com founder Jeff Bezos by managing his personal investments. The firm invests in early stage ventures, late stage ventures and seed stages of companies in many different sectors.

Background 

Bezos Expeditions was founded in 2005 by Jeff Bezos as an investment vehicle to manage his personal investments. The firm has a dedicated team responsible for handling all processes related to investments. The firm has made numerous high-profile investments such as Twitter, Airbnb, Uber, Stack Overflow, General Assembly, Workday and Business Insider.

Aside from for-profit ventures, the firm also supports funding philanthropic efforts. Examples include an Innovation center at the Seattle Museum of History and Industry and the Bezos Center for Neural Circuit Dynamics at Princeton Neuroscience Institute. In 2013, Bezos Expeditions funded the recovery of two Saturn V first-stage Rocketdyne F-1 engines from the floor of the Atlantic Ocean. They were positively identified as belonging to the Apollo 11 mission's S-1C stage from July 1969. The engines are currently on display at the Seattle Museum of Flight.

Bezos Expeditions has funded the Clock of the Long Now also called the 10,000-year clock. It was funded with $42 million, and is on land which Bezos owns in Texas.

Notable investments 

 Airbnb
 Basecamp
 Blue Origin
 Business Insider
 Clock of the Long Now
 Convoy
 Domo
 D-Wave Systems
 Fundbox
 General Assembly
 General Fusion
 Glassybaby
 GRAIL
 Juno Therapeutics
 La Haus
 Lookout
 MakerBot
 Nextdoor
 NotCo
 Overtime
 Pioneer Square Labs
 Rescale
 Sonder Corp.
 Stack Overflow
 The Washington Post
 Twitter
 Uber
 Unity Biotechnology
 Vicarious
 Workday
 Zocdoc

References

External links
Company website

Companies based in Washington (state)
Financial services companies established in 2005
Investment management companies of the United States
Venture capital firms of the United States